Ruth Nussinov (Hebrew: פרופסור רות נוסינוב) is an Israeli-American biologist who works as a Professor in the Department of Human Genetics, School of Medicine at Tel Aviv University and is the Senior Principal Scientist and Principal Investigator at the National Cancer Institute, National Institutes of Health. Nussinov is also the Editor in Chief for the journal PLOS Computational Biology.

Nussinov proposed the first dynamic programming approach for nucleic acid secondary structure prediction, this method is now known as the Nussinov algorithm.

Career
Ruth Nussinov received her B.Sc in Microbiology from University of Washington in 1966, her M.Sc in Biochemistry from Rutgers University in 1967 and her Ph.D. in Biochemistry from Rutgers in 1977. Her thesis was titled Secondary structure analysis of nucleic acids. She was a fellow at the Weizmann Institute and worked as a visiting scientist at Berkeley and at Harvard. She took a position at Tel Aviv University in 1985 as Associate Professor and was promoted to Professor in 1990.

Besides her work on nucleic acid secondary structure prediction, Nussinov is also regarded as a pioneer in DNA sequence analysis for her work in the early 1980s.

Nussinov has authored over 500 scientific papers and is the Editor in Chief of the journal PLOS Computational Biology. She also serves on the editorial boards of the journals Physical Biology, Proteins, BMC Bioinformatics and the Journal of Biological Chemistry.

Awards
Nussinov was made a Fellow of the Biophysical Society in 2011, for her "extraordinary contributions to advances in computational biology on both nucleic acids and proteins". She became a Fellow of the International Society for Computational Biology (ISCB) in 2013. In 2018, Nussinov was awarded the ISCB Senior Scientist Award. In 2020, Nussinov was elected Fellow of the American Physical Society.

References

Living people
Israeli bioinformaticians
Fellows of the International Society for Computational Biology
Year of birth missing (living people)
University of Washington alumni
Rutgers University alumni
Academic staff of Tel Aviv University
Fellows of the American Physical Society